Kirada (Brahmi:  Ki-ra-da, ruled 335-345 CE), is considered by modern scholarship as the first known ruler of the Kidarite Huns in the area of Gandhara in northwestern India, possibly at the same time as another Kidarite ruler named Yosada. 

The name of Kirada name appears on numerous coins at the end of the Kushan Empire and the beginning of the rule of the Kidarite Huns in the area of Central and Western Punjab in India, in the period circa 340-345 CE. 

The name  Ga-ḍa-ha-ra (for the region of Gandhara) appears vertically as a monogram in the right field of the coins of Kirada, as on some slightly earlier coins signed Samudragupta, or subsequent coins of other early Kidarite rulers named Yasada, Peroz and Kidara. The appearance of the name Samudragupta may suggest some kind of suzerainty at a time in relation with the Gupta Empire.

The coins of Kirada would have followed those in the name of Samudragupta in Gandhara, and it is thought that Kirada was succeeded as Kidarite ruler by another Kidarite Peroz and then the famous Kidara. Altogether they form the first coin issues after the reign of the last Kushan ruler Kipunada.

Kirada also struck in Balkh coins in the name of the last Kushano-Sasanian ruler Varahran I Kushanshah circa CE 340-345, incorporating the Kidarite  which replaced the nandipada which had been in use before the rise of the Kidarites.

References

4th-century monarchs in Asia